Ray Shawn Jackson (born August 28, 1967), known as The Gillham Park Strangler, is an American serial killer who strangled to death six women in Kansas City, Missouri from 1989 to 1990, dumping the victims' bodies in the area surrounding Gilliam Park.

Biography 
Ray Shawn Jackson was born on August 28, 1967, as the only son of his parents. At age seven, his family moved him to Kansas City, where he was raised in a rather poor environment. In his late teens, he began working as a semiliterate laborer.

Murders 
In the span of seven months, between September 1989 and April 1990, the bodies of six women were found dumped in areas in or around Gillham park, mid-town of Kansas City, Missouri. They were prostitutes in their 20s and 30s.  

In April 1990, a man walking his dog through Gillham Park spotted a man having sex with a woman. Upon closer inspection, however, it became clear that it was an act of rape. The perpetrator fled the area when the man intervened. The woman regained consciousness and was able to give a description of the man. Police had an idea of the suspect's geographic pattern, as he either lives near, or had connections with the park. After questioning people in the area, they told police about Ray Jackson. Police took Jackson into questioning, and after an interrogation, he confessed. He told the police that he had been involved in multiple murders.

Jackson said he would walk alone at night and ask women on the streets if they wanted to smoke crack cocaine. After the woman agreed, he would walk with her to a secluded area in or near Gillham Park, where he choked them from behind until they lost consciousness. He would then awaken them, strip them, rape them, and strangle them. Jackson would position the bodies in sexually provocative poses and leave their clothes strewn around the crime scene.

The case of the surviving victim was different in that Jackson had followed her beforehand. When he asked her to join him, she refused. Jackson later attacked her and dragged into some bushes, where he tried to choke her before the passerby intervened.

Conviction 
To avoid a possible death sentence, Jackson pleaded guilty to six counts of first degree murder and one count of first degree assault for the surviving victim. He was sentenced to life in prison without parole. Jackson is currently incarcerated at South Central Correctional Center.

See also 
 List of serial killers in the United States

References 

1967 births
1989 crimes in the United States
1990 murders in the United States
20th-century African-American people
20th-century American criminals
American male criminals
American prisoners sentenced to life imprisonment
American rapists
American serial killers
Crimes against sex workers in the United States
Living people
Male serial killers
People convicted of murder by Missouri
Prisoners sentenced to life imprisonment by Missouri
Violence against women in the United States